The , also known as , was an immigrant clan active in Japan since the Kofun period (250–538), according to the history of Japan laid out in the Nihon Shoki. The name fuhito comes from their occupation as scribes. They were descended from Prince Junda (Junda Taishi) who died in 513 in Japan. He was a son of the 25th king of Baekje, Mureyong. His brother Seong became the 26th king of Baekje and his nephew Prince Imseong also settled in Japan.

With the 2002 FIFA World Cup coming, an event hosted by  Japan and South Korea, Emperor Akihito told reporters "I, on my part, feel a certain kinship with Korea, given the fact that it is recorded in the Chronicles of Japan that the mother of Emperor Kammu [Niigasa] was of the line of King Muryong of Baekje." According to the Shoku Nihongi, Niigasa was a descendant of Prince Junda, son of Muryeong.

It was the first time that a reigning Japanese emperor himself mentioned Korean blood in the imperial line, although  it was nothing  unknown at the time. During the Japanese Empire, the Imperial family and its Korean ancestry was often used under the pretext of assimilating Koreans. This was done in order to encourage Korean subjects of the Japanese Empire to embrace Japanization and the Japanese Emperor's divinity.

Family tree
 (462–523) – called Semakishi (嶋君)/King Shima (斯麻王) because he was born on the island of Kyushu

 "Junda-taishi" (c. 480–513) – son of King Mureyong who settled in Japan
 
 (c.510–?)
 
 (c. 540–?)

 (c. 570–?)

 (c. 600–?)

 (c. 630–?)

 (c. 660–?)
 
 (c. 690–?)

 (c. 720–90) – daughter of Ototsugu, concubine of Emperor Kōnin, mother of Emperor Kanmu

See also
 Yamato people
 Tomb of King Muryeong
 Koreans in Japan

References

Japanese clans
Japanese people of Korean descent